General elections were held in Peru on 9 April 2000, with a run-off of the presidential election on 28 May. The elections were highly controversial and widely considered to have been fraudulent. Incumbent President Alberto Fujimori was re-elected for a third term with almost three-quarters of the vote.  However, the elections were tainted with allegations of unconstitutionality, bribery, structural bias, and outright electoral fraud. Alejandro Toledo boycotted the second round of the presidential election, in which over 30% of ballots were declared invalid. Fujimori subsequently called for new elections, fled Peru, and faxed in his resignation from a hotel in Japan.

Constitutional issues
The Constitution of Peru specifically limited presidents to two terms, and Fujimori relied on the legally questionable theory that the restriction did not apply to him in 2000 because the 1993 Constitution was written after he nullified the previous constitution, at which time he was already in power. The electoral bodies, the National Office of Electoral Processes (ONPE) and National Jury of Elections (Peru) (JNE), were staffed at the time with Fujimori supporters who were considered by many to be corrupt.  These bodies accepted Fujimori's argument.

Structural bias
Many observers believed that the government structures were set up in a way that gave Fujimori's re-election bid an unfair advantage.  For example, the United States Department of State noted that generals of the Peruvian Army were removed from their positions if anti-Fujimori protests occurred in their jurisdiction, providing the army with an incentive to crack down on anti-government protesters.  A cable from the American embassy to Peru noted that "gigantic pro-Fujimori slogans appeared on the sides of hills within some military reservations and bases.  Mostly at night but sometimes in broad daylight, troops have been sighted from Tacna to Tumbes painting pro-Fujimori slogans and blacking out the slogans of opposition candidates.  Military vehicles have been made available to government candidates to transport supplies and people at no charge" and that "routine public works projects" were arraigned "to maximize electoral impact."

Fraud
The elections were also marred with accusations of outright fraud.  During the campaign, El Comercio broke a story about a "fábrica de firmas" (signature factory) in which many people worked signing a petition to register a pro-Fujimori political party.  Several of the people involved admitted to their part in this scheme.  Perhaps most damning, they had copied the signatures of voters from official ONPE voter-registration lists, which were provided to them.

Shortly before the election, several people, including JNE workers, were arrested for their part in the theft of ballots.  They were caught with the ballots, many of which had been filled out.  The plurality of these ballots was filled out with votes for Fujimori and his electoral allies.

Boycott
After Fujimori was declared the victor of the first round, Alejandro Toledo called for a boycott of the second round.  Fujimori responded by reminding voters that Peruvian law makes voting obligatory, and that anyone boycotting the election could be fined.  Toledo then suggested that his supporters to cast spoiled ballots.  The result was that while votes for Toledo declined from 40.24% of the valid votes cast in the first round to 25.67% of the valid votes in the second round, invalid votes jumped from 2.25% in of the total votes cast in the first round to 29.93% of total votes in the second round.  That such a large percentage of votes were thrown out as invalid shows that many Peruvians took Toledo's advice and deliberately spoiled their ballots.

OAS process
Following the election  the Organization of American States (OAS) established a "mesa" dialogue process (Mesa de Dialogo). The Mesa "filled the institutional vacuum caused by the polarization of political forces in Peru following the May 2000 elections. It became the locus of authoritative decisionmaking power during the final days of the Fujimori government, preparing the way for the Peruvian opposition to win control of the congress and to form an interim government." The dialogue was facilitated by a former foreign minister from the Dominican Republic, Eduardo Latorre, supported by a small OAS secretariat. The Mesa had eighteen participants and "deliberately incorporated three key sets of actors: government ministers, progovernment and opposition members of congress, and civil society representatives."

Alejandro Toledo and his Possible Peru political party were initially reluctant to engage in the Mesa, initially considering the OAS mission an attempt to prop up the Fujimori regime. Not wanting to either engage fully with the OAS mission or be isolated from the Mesa completely, Toledo remained at the edge of the process, allowing others to be directly involved in the negotiations, including Luis Solari. Toledo focused instead on international media appearances and organizing large demonstrations.

In the latter part of 2000 a series of dramatic events brought the dialogue potential of the Mesa into the foreground. On 14 September a videotape was broadcast showing security chief Vladimiro Montesinos bribing opposition congressman Alberto Kouri to join Fujimori's congressional coalition (Peru 2000). This prompted Fujimori to announce new elections and dismiss Montesinos. Further shocks followed, with Montesinos appearing in Panama to seek asylum, and then returning to Peru on 23 October, "creating fear of an imminent coup." Finally, on 20 November Fujimori faxed his resignation from Japan.

As these events unfolded, the mesa became increasingly prominent as a parallel congress with de facto political decision making power. In the institutional void created by congressional deadlock and political power struggles, few other nonviolent choices existed. As events during September and October led increasingly to a showdown between Fujimori and Montesinos, the former displayed a greater willingness to agree to political reforms in exchange for support from the OAS and the Peruvian political representatives assembled at the mesa. Despite all of the suspicions harbored by the opposition, the mesa remained a useful fallback option and a buffer against the threat of military disruption."

Results

President

Congress

References

Elections in Peru
Peru
2000 in Peru
Presidential elections in Peru
Election
Annulled elections